Maja Trojan or Trojan ( or Trojan, Serbian/Montenegrin: Trojan) is a mountain in the Accursed Mountains range on the border of Albania and Montenegro. From the summit of Trojan there is a wonderful panoramic view of the Accursed Mountains and other ranges in the Dinaric Alps such as Visitor.

References

Mountains of Albania
Mountains of Montenegro
Accursed Mountains
Albania–Montenegro border